Laguna is a locality in the city of Cessnock, in the Hunter Region of New South Wales, Australia.

History
Laguna House is located to the south of Laguna on the Great North Road.

References 

Suburbs of City of Cessnock